The Green Room Club was a New York fraternal organization founded on December 20, 1902, for men involved in the dramatic arts.  Its members included actors, managers, singers, composers, librettists, dramatists, other members of the theatrical profession, journalists, and lay members. Its purpose was to bring actors and managers into close personal relations.

Library 
By 1908, the club claimed that its library held the most complete collection of dramatic materials in the country and had a goal of building it into the most complete in the world.  Aubrey Boucicault (son of Dion Boucicault and brother of Nina Boucicault) was the chairman of the library committee in 1906.

Club founding 
The Green Room Club was founded in 1902.  Those signing the articles of incorporation were by William A. Brady, Milton Nobles, Thomas McGrath, Walter Fessler, F.F. MacKay, and Charles Dickson.  Some of its founding members had been former members of the Actors Order of Friendship.  They founded the Green Room with the aim of attracting younger actors.  But later, the club became the primary social organization for managers and producers of theater, whose members included David Belasco and Daniel Frohman.

Club dissolution 
The Green Room Club disbanded on November 11, 1928, under financial duress.  Among other things, the organization was in arrears on rent for its clubhouse located at 19 West 48th Street.  Its landlord was Columbia University, which, at the time, was located in that area.

Former addresses 
 1921: 139 West 47th Street
 1938: 19 West 48th Street

Former officers 
The elected officials were titled Prompter (president), Call Boy (vice president), Copyist (secretary), and Angel (treasurer).  Its board of directors were referred to as Board of Supers.

Prompters
 1902–19??: William Aloysius Brady (1863–1950), actor, producer
 19??–1908: Hollis Eli Cooley (1859–1918), theater manager
 1908–1909: Herbert Hall Winslow (1865–1930), playwright
 1909–1910: James O'Neill (1847–1920), actor, father of playwright Eugene O'Neill
 1911–1912: George M. Cohan (1878–1942), entertainer, actor, playwright, composer, lyricists, dancer, producer   
 1912–19??: Frank G. Stanley ( –1921), theatrical insurance agent
 1916–1920: Edwards Davis (1873–1936), actor
 circa 1920: Frank Bacon (1864–1922), actor, playwright 
 1922–1923: Frank Gillmore (1867–1943), actor, playwright
 1924–1926: S. Jay Kaufman (1886–1957), stage columnist
 1926–1928: Paul A. Meyer (1870–1953), co-publisher of Theater Magazine & theater impresario

Other thespian clubs in New York City 
 The Lambs
 Friars Club
 Strollers Club
 The Dunlap Society
 Note:  Neither the Green Room Club of London nor the Green Room Club of Melbourne was affiliated with the Green Room Club of New York.

References 
General references
 Articles of Incorporation, Constitution, By-Laws and House Rules, With List of Officers and Members of the Green Room Club, (1904) 
 Articles of Incorporation, Constitution, By-Laws and House Rules, With list of officers and members of the Green Room Club (1909) 
 A General Letter of Invitation to the Annual Dress Rehearsal of the Green Room Club (1916) 
Inline citations

Theatrical organizations in the United States
Arts organizations established in 1902
1902 establishments in New York City